Elke Vanhoof (born ) is a Belgian female  BMX rider, representing her nation at international competitions. She competed in the time trial event and race event at the 2015 UCI BMX World Championships. She is openly lesbian.

References

External links
 

1991 births
Living people
BMX riders
Belgian sportswomen
Belgian female cyclists
Place of birth missing (living people)
Cyclists at the 2015 European Games
European Games competitors for Belgium
Olympic cyclists of Belgium
Cyclists at the 2016 Summer Olympics
Cyclists at the 2020 Summer Olympics
Belgium LGBT sportspeople
People from Mol, Belgium
Cyclists from Antwerp Province
21st-century Belgian women